Polonia sive de situ, populis, moribus, magistratibus et Republica regni Polonici libri duo is a book by Marcin Kromer, first published in Cologne in 1577 in Latin. The title in English is Poland or About the Geography, Population, Customs, Offices, and Public Matters of the Polish Kingdom in Two Volumes. The first Polish translation was made in 1853 (Polska, czyli o położeniu, obyczajach, urzędach Rzeczypospolitej Królestwa Polskiego).

Contents
The book describes the topography, peoples, their habits and mores, as well as the political structure and administration of Polandin the late 16th century. There have been several editions of this book with varying contents. The main chapters include:

 I. Borders of Poland
 II. The shape of surface
 III. Mineral resources
 IV. Hydrography
 V. Climate, flora, fauna
 VI. Towns and villages

Some editions were accompanied by with maps (drawn by Marcin Kromer himself) of:
 Rivers of Poland
 Cities of Poland
 Province of Warmia

Notes

External links
English translation of excerpts:  http://www.staropolska.pl/ang/renaissance/Kromer/polonia.php3
 Polonia sive de situ,... in digital library Polona

1577 books
1577 in the Polish–Lithuanian Commonwealth
Polish non-fiction books
16th-century Latin books